Fatso The Bear is a Walter Lantz character, who made his first appearance in the cartoon "Hunger Strife", in 1960. His final appearance was in 1961, in "The Bear and the Bees". The bear is essentially a "clone" of Disney's Humphrey the Bear,  in terms of physical appearance, gruff voice, and personality. This makes sense, as the character was created by Jack Hannah, who had directed most of the Donald Duck cartoons at Disney back in the mid-1940s into the 1950s.

List of appearances:
"Hunger Strife" (10/05/1960)
"Eggnapper" (02/14/1961)
"Bear and the Bees" (05/01/1961)

See also
List of Walter Lantz cartoons
List of Walter Lantz cartoon characters

References

External links 
 The Walter Lantz-o-Pedia

Fictional bears
Fictional anthropomorphic characters
Film characters introduced in 1960
Animated characters introduced in 1960
Male characters in animation
Universal Pictures cartoons and characters
Walter Lantz Productions shorts
Walter Lantz Productions cartoons and characters